Paranoid Cocoon is the second album by Cotton Jones, which was released on January 27, 2009.  It was the band's debut on Suicide Squeeze Records.  The band's sound was described as an "intriguing mix of country and melancholy psychedelia" and comparisons were made with Johnny Cash, Mazzy Star, and Beach House.

Track listing

References

External links
SuicideSqueeze.net

Suicide Squeeze Records albums
2009 albums
Cotton Jones albums